Matthew Noble (23 March 1817 – 23 June 1876) was a leading British portrait sculptor. Carver of numerous monumental figures and busts including work memorializing Victorian era royalty and statesmen displayed in locations such as Westminster Abbey, St. Paul's Cathedral and in Parliament Square, London.

Life
Noble was born in Hackness, near Scarborough, as the son of a stonemason, and served his apprenticeship under his father.  He left Yorkshire for London when quite young, there he studied under John Francis (the father of sculptor Mary Thornycroft). Exhibiting regularly at the Royal Academy from 1845 until his death, Noble became recognised after winning the competition to construct the Wellington Monument in Manchester in 1856.

Noble was exceptionally prolific and created portrait busts, statues and monuments. One of his sons, Herbert, also showed great promise as a sculptor. Herbert died, however, in January 1876, at the age of nineteen, in a railway accident at Abbots Ripton, Cambridgeshire. The loss of Herbert and another son is said to have contributed to Noble's early death, at the age of 58, from pleuropneumonia at his home, 43 Abingdon Villas, Kensington. He is buried in Brompton Cemetery, London, on the west side of the main entrance path from the north, towards the central colonnade.  His uncompleted works were finished by his assistant, J. Edwards.

Selected works

1850-1859

1860-1869

1870 and later

Church monuments and memorials
Throughout his career Noble was responsible for creating a number of monuments and memorials for British churches and cathedrals. Examples include

 Carved stone reredos depicting The Last Supper in the Church of All Saints at Eskdaleside cum Ugglebarnby in North Yorkshire.
 Wall monument to Lady Vanden Bempde-Johnstone in the Church of St. Peter, Hackness, North Yorkshire.
 Wall tablet memorial to Ann Harland, died 1844, in the Church of All Saints at Brompton, Scarborough.
 Pink granite tomb monument with bust, now lost, to Thomas Hood, died 1845, in Kensal Green Cemetery, London.
 A monument to Lord Francis Egerton, 1st Earl of Ellesmere, died 1857, designed by George Gilbert Scott with an effigy by Noble in the Church of St. Mark, Salford.
 An 1859 memorial to F. J. Robinson, 1st Viscount Goderich, designed by George Gilbert Scott and carved by Noble, in the Church of All Saints, Nocton, Lincolnshire.
 Tomb chest with effigy, in grey and white marble, as a memorial to Thomas de Grey, 2nd Earl de Grey, died 1859, in the Church of Saint John the Baptist at Flitton.
 A chest monument with marble effigy to John Elphinstone, 13th Lord Elphinstone, died 1860, in the Church of St Peter, Limpsfield, Surrey.
 Monument, with effigy, to Sir Thomas Fermor-Hesketh, 5th Baronet, died 1872, in the Church of St. Mary the Virgin at Rufford, Lancashire.
 A monument, with life-size figures, dating from 1872 to William and Mary Heath in the Church of St. Lawrence at Biddulph, Staffordshire.
 Recumbent effigy of Sir Stephen Glynne (d. 1874) in St Deiniol's Church, Hawarden
 Memorial to Rev Henry Venn, 1875, St Paul's Cathedral, London
 Chest monument with effigy to Lord Lyveden, died 1876, in the Church of St Andrew, Brigstock, Northamptonshire.
 Several memorials, dating from 1868 to 1888, in the Church of St Mary and All Saints at Swynnerton, Staffordshire.

Other works

 Bust of David Napier, 1871, Glasgow Transport Museum
 Statue of William Cotton, 1855, Bank of England
 Busts of Oliver Cromwell, Queen Victoria and Albert, Prince Consort in Manchester Town Hall
 Bust of former mayor Thomas Goadsby, 1862, in Manchester Town Hall
 Statues, on high cylindrical pedestals, of Queen Victoria, 1858, and Albert, Prince Consort, 1865, in the foyer of Leeds Town Hall
 Marble busts of Edward, Prince of Wales and of Queen Alexandra in Leeds Town Hall
 James McGrigor in the small garden to the Royal Army Medical College, London
 Statues of David Hume, John Hunter and Humphry Davy at the rear of the Royal Academy building, London
 Captain William (Bill) Henry Cecil George Pechell (1830–1855) now in Waterloo Street Community Garden, Hove, East Sussex
 Bust of Frederick Dawes Danvers completed in 1863
 Marble statue of Charles Canning, 1st Earl Canning and a bust of Charlotte Canning, Countess Canning, both 1852, both for the interior of the Victoria Memorial, Kolkata
 Statue of Richard Bourke, 6th Earl of Mayo, c. 1875, at Mayo College, Ajmer, India
 Statue of Albert, Prince Consort, Bombay, India, 1869. Located at the Dr. Bhau Daji Lad Museum, Mumbai
 Marble statue of Queen Victoria and marble canopy, Bombay, India, 1872. Currently located in the grounds of the Dr. Bhau Daji Lad Museum, Mumbai.
 Statue of William Duncombe, 2nd Baron Feversham in the monument with canopy, designed by George Gilbert Scott, erected in his memory at Helmsley, North Yorkshire, c. 1867.

References

External links 

 
 Matthew Noble at sculpture.gla.ac.uk

1818 births
1876 deaths
19th-century English sculptors
19th-century English male artists
Artists from Yorkshire
Artists of the Boston Public Library
Burials at Brompton Cemetery
English male sculptors
People from Hackness